Metanarsia piskunovi is a moth of the family Gelechiidae. It is found in Mongolia and Qinghai, China.

The length of the forewings is 10–11 mm. The forewings are light yellow, the termen with some brown scales. The hindwings are light grey. Adults are on wing from July to early August.

Etymology
The species is named in honour of Dr. Vladimir I. Piskunov.

References

Moths described in 2005
Metanarsia